Noelia Serra-Djamdjean (born 9 September 1977) is a Dominican-Spanish former professional tennis player.

Before changing allegiances to Spain, Serra won three medals for the Dominican Republic at the 1993 Central American and Caribbean Games in Ponce, Puerto Rico. She and Joelle Schad were gold medalists in the team event and also partnered together to win a silver medal in the doubles. In the singles event, Serra claimed a bronze medal.

Serra reached a career best singles ranking of 236 in the world and won three singles titles on the ITF Women's Circuit. Her only WTA Tour main-draw appearance came as a local wildcard entrant at the 1996 Madrid Open, where she was beaten in the first round by Argentina's Florencia Labat.

ITF finals

Singles: 5 (3–2)

Doubles: 3 (2–1)

References

External links
 
 

1977 births
Living people
Spanish female tennis players
Dominican Republic female tennis players
Dominican Republic emigrants to Spain
Competitors at the 1993 Central American and Caribbean Games
Central American and Caribbean Games gold medalists for the Dominican Republic
Central American and Caribbean Games silver medalists for the Dominican Republic
Central American and Caribbean Games bronze medalists for the Dominican Republic
Central American and Caribbean Games medalists in tennis